Savoy Mont Blanc University (a.k.a. Chambéry University) is a public university in the region of Savoy, with one campus in Annecy and two around Chambéry.

Campuses
The university was officially founded in 1979 from several colleges founded in the 1960s and 1970s. To avoid a straight choice between the two biggest towns of the Savoie/Haute-Savoie region, the authorities decided to set up a campus in each city for different areas of study.
The university has three campuses:

 The Annecy-le-Vieux campus (near Annecy) is the university's "technology institute" (IUT), and teaches engineering-related subjects and business and administration related subjects. There is either the faculty of economics and management (IMUS, Institut de Management de l'Université de Savoie).
 Jacob-Bellecombette (1.5 km south of Chambéry) is the campus for students of languages, literature, social sciences, law and economics. It has a library, sports hall and one cafeteria. Chambéry is the home of the university's presidence and administrative buildings.
 The Technolac campus at Bourget-du-Lac (12 km north of Chambéry) teaches science.

History

 Between 1295 and 1563, Chambéry was the capital of Savoy. The University of Turin was founded in 1404, and Chambéry was the home of an école préparatoire, a school preparing students to go there. But there was no university in Chambéry in this period, and Turin took over from Chambéry as Savoy's capital in 1563.
 The annexation of Savoy by France after the unification of Italy meant that Chambéry had an académie between 1860 and 1920, but not a university.
 During the movement creating new universities in the 1960s, a Savoy Collège Scientifique Universitaire (CSU) was created, then a Collège Littéraire Universitaire (CLU) in 1963. These colleges were merged, creating the Centre Universitaire de Savoie (CUS), at Chambéry, on 9 May 1969. In 1973, Annecy's technical and business college, the Institut Universitaire Technologique (IUT), was founded, and from 27 June 1979, the CUS was officially classed as a university. It was later renamed the Université de Savoie and then in May 2014 Université Savoie Mont Blanc

Number of students

Foreign students
After Paris I, Pantheon-Assas University and  Strasbourg III, Savoy has the fourth-highest number of Erasmus exchange students in France. The school of international relations has signed 228 conventions with universities in 82 countries, and the university takes more than 1,000 foreign students per year overall.
Europe 71%
United Kingdom 17%
Italy 10.5%
Germany 10%
Spain 8%
Sweden 5%
North America: 7%
Eastern Europe (Pays d'Europe centrale, orientale et nouveaux États indépendants de l'ex-Union soviétique): 5%
Asia: 6%
North Africa/Middle-East: 5%
Latin America: 2.5%
Africa: 2.5%
Australia/New Zealand: 1%

Gallery

Chambéry campus

Annecy campus

Departments

Annecy
 IUT d'Annecy]
 Département Techniques de Commercialisation
 Département Mesures Physiques
 Département Génie Mécanique et Productique
 Département Génie Électrique et Informatique Industrielle
 Département Réseaux et Télécoms
 IAE Savoie Mont Blanc
 Polytech Annecy-Chambéry

Chambéry
 School of literature, languages and human sciences (LLSH)
 School of law and business
 IAE Savoie Mont Blanc

Bourget-du-Lac
 School of applied sciences
 IUT de Chambéry
 Polytech Annecy-Chambéry

Notable people

Faculty
 Michel Soutif (1921 – 2016) - physicist and educator

Alumni
 Aicha Elbasri (born in Morocco) - writer and former United Nations official
 Surano (born 1955) - geophysicist and volcanologist from Indonesia
 Ulla Tørnæs (born 1962, in Esbjerg) - Danish politician
 Yang Lan (born 1968, Beijing) - media proprietor, journalist, and talk show host 
 Bruno Wu (born 1966) - Chinese entrepreneur
 Xavier Roseren (born 1970, in Chamonix) - shopkeeper and politician LREM
 Yann Barthès (born 1974) - journalist, TV presenter and producer
 Émilie Bonnivard (born 1980)  politician LR
 Léo Trespeuch (born 1987) - snowboarding champion
 Christophe Lemaitre (born 1990) - sprinter 
 Clément Noël (born 1997) - alpine ski racer

Recipients of honorary degree
 Norberto Bobbio (1909 – 2004) - Italian philosopher of law and political sciences and a historian of political thought
 Fabiola Gianotti (born 1960) - Italian experimental particle physicist; first woman to be Director-General at CERN (European Organization for Nuclear Research)

References

External links
 Official homepage of the University of Savoy Mont Blanc

University Savoie Mont Blanc
Educational institutions established in the 1960s
University of Savoy
1960s establishments in France
Universities and colleges in Chambéry
Education in Annecy
Universities in Auvergne-Rhône-Alpes
Jacob-Bellecombette
Le Bourget-du-Lac